Marcial Ávalos (born 5 December 1921, date of death unknown) was a Paraguayan football forward who played for Paraguay in the 1950 FIFA World Cup. He also played for Cerro Porteño.

References

External links
FIFA profile

1921 births
Year of death missing
Paraguayan footballers
Paraguay international footballers
Association football forwards
Cerro Porteño players
1950 FIFA World Cup players